Jack K. Pleis (May 11, 1917 – December 5, 1990) was an American jazz pianist, arranger, conductor, composer and producer. He recorded on London and Decca Records in the 1950s, and Columbia Records in the 1960s. During the course of his career, Pleis worked with many artists, including Louis Armstrong, Harry Belafonte,  Bing Crosby, Sammy Davis Jr., Benny Goodman, Earl Grant, Brenda Lee, and Joe Williams. Between 1950 and 1976, more than 150 songs were arranged by Pleis. His surname is pronounced "Pleece" (to rhyme with "fleece").

Early life and education
Jack Pleis was born in Philadelphia on May 11, 1917. Starting at the age of four, he began his training in classical piano. He first performed in concert when he was seven. By the time he was eleven, he appeared on radio programs for children.

Pleis enrolled in college intending to study medicine. To support his studies, he played piano in jazz and popular music bands. Eventually he left school and moved to New York City, where he began his musical career.

Career

Early days
In New York, Pleis became successful as a pianist, arranger, conductor, and composer. He was one of Jan Savitt's Top Hatters, playing piano and doing arrangements, a position he left in 1942 to enlist in the Army during World War II. In 1947, the Jack Pleis Trio provided instrumental support for Larry Laurence (with The Quintones providing vocal harmonies). By 1948, Pleis was working at the RCA Victor studios on 24th Street, appearing on the cover of the January 1, 1949, issue of  Billboard playing piano at the studio's holiday party. His orchestra backed Teresa Brewer and Bobby Wayne on their 1949 single "Copper Canyon"/"'Way Back Home". Pleis was also part of the Dixieland All-Stars group which backed Brewer's breakout hit (and signature song) "Music! Music! Music!" in late 1949.

London Records
Pleis joined the  American Society of Composers, Authors and Publishers (ASCAP) in 1950. He began work as arranger and composer at London Records under Tutti Camarata. The orchestra backed Ralph Young on his 1950 London single "Please Treat Her Nicer"/"I've Got the World on a String", and Pleis released his own single "Ragging the Scale"/"Story of the Stars", the B-side of which ranked at number 10 on "The Disk Jockeys Pick" in Billboard. In early May 1950, he accompanied his future wife, London recording artist Eve Young, on a promotional tour prior to her opening show. Pleis released several more singles, "Time Alone (Can Heal a Broken Heart)"/"What is There to Say", "I'll Always Be in Love with You"/"Caravan", and "Le Petite Valse"/"Ragamuffin", and the orchestra backed Snooky Lanson on his 1950 London single "You Wonderful You"/"Honestly I Love You".

In June 1950, Pleis married Eve Young, and the March birth of their daughter Michelle was noted in an April 1951 Billboard. The Orchestra backed Eve on her single "Just for Tonight"/"Would I Love You?" In 1952, Pleis and orchestra worked with The Bell Sisters and continued working with Teresa Brewer. Pleis left London Records, and Eve signed a new contract with Coral Records, recording under her new name, Karen Chandler. Her debut for Coral, backed by Pleis' orchestra, was the song "Hold Me, Thrill Me, Kiss Me," and it became an enormous hit. Selling over a million copies, it peaked at No. 5 on the Billboard charts. In 1953, Pleis and orchestra backed her on her third Coral release, "I'd Love to Fall Asleep (And Wake Up in Your Arms)"/"Goodbye, Charlie, Goodbye".

Decca Records
In mid-1953 Pleis joined Decca Records under Milt Gabler. Pleis and Orchestra released "The Eighteenth Variation"/"Mr. Peepers" under the Decca label. The orchestra backed Karen Chandler again on "Why?"/"Flash From the Blue". 1954 saw the release of the orchestra's Decca singles, "Frenchman in St. Louis"/"Pagan in Paris", "Ah Ri Rung", and "For Always"/"Beyond the Blue Horizon", and the orchestra backed the Dinning Sisters on "Steel Guitar Rag", Eileen Barton on "And Then", and Teresa Brewer on her album A Bouquet of Hits.

1955 saw Pleis scheduled to be profiled in the April issue of The American Magazine. Pleis and His Orchestra began releasing singles of Disney film songs (also collected and released on the album Music from Disneyland), and also released "Lies"/"Hey There" and "Pauline"/"The Trouble With Harry", the title tune for Alfred Hitchcock's film, The Trouble with Harry.

In 1956, Pleis and His Orchestra again backed Karen Chandler, this time on her first Decca release, and Pleis released another album, Strings and Things. The orchestra backed Bobby Darrin on his single "Rock Island Line"/"Timber". In October, Pleiss' song "Giant", theme of the film Giant, debuted on the Billboard Hot 100 at #93, peaking at #91 in December, and the song "I'll Always Be In Love With You" charted at #65, also in December. Pleis also produced Bing Crosby's album, Songs I Wish I Had Sung the First Time Around.

1957 saw the release of singles "(But As They Say) That's Life"/"Goodnight Waltz", "Search for Paradise"/"Serenade to Michelle", and "The Carefree Heart"/"Serenade in Soft Shoe", and the Orchestra backed Georgie Shaw on "One More Sunrise", Sammy Davis Jr. on "The Golden Key", and Merv Griffin on "I'll Be Thinking of You".  "(But As They Say) That's Life" charted at #69 in June 1957.

In 1958, the Orchestra backed Carmen McRae on her album Mad About the Man, as well as Toni Arden and also backed The Four Aces on their album Swingin Aces. He produced the Kalin Twins song "When", which spent five weeks at No. 1 on the UK charts.

In 1960, Pleis conducted for The Castilians' album, Valentino Tangos. Pleis and Orchestra backed Sammy Davis Jr. on a dozen tracks for Decca, including "What Kind of Fool Am I?" (which won the Grammy Award for Song of the Year in 1963), "The Lady Is a Tramp", "I Gotta Right to Sing the Blues", "Do Nothin' Till You Hear From Me", "I Got a Woman", "There Is No Greater Love", "Gee, Baby, Ain't I Good to You", "This Little Girl of Mine", "Till Then", and "Mess Around".

Columbia Records
The 1960s brought a move to Columbia Records. In 1961, Pleis and Orchestra backed Brazilian singer Maysa Matarazzo on her album Maysa Sings Songs Before Dawn, he conducted for Billy Butterfield's album, The Golden Horn, and arranged several of the tracks on Lionel Hampton's album, Soft Vibes Soaring Strings.  Pleis also produced Les Elgart's album, "It's De-Lovely" For Dancing and Listening, and released an EP, Medley from The Musical "Through The Years", and an LP, Stage Left, Stage Right. In 1963, he conducted for Peter Nero's album, Born Free, and Pleis and Orchestra backed Liza Minnelli on her single, "One Summer Love"/"How Much Do I Love You?".

Film and television scores
Pleis and His Orchestra performed the songs "Strange Feelings" and "The Blues I Got Comin' Tomorrow" for the soundtrack of the 1961 film, Force of Impulse. Pleis composed and conducted the music for the 1964 film, Diary of a Bachelor. He also composed music for the television shows Family Affair (1966), Gunsmoke (1967), The Wild Wild West (1967–1969), and Dusty's Trail (1973–1974).

Later career
Pleis arranged the songs on side one of Johnny Hartman's 1967 album, I Love Everybody, including "If I Had You", "I Cover the Waterfront", and "For Once in My Life".

Under the moniker The Sound of Our Times, Pleis co-produced and penned two songs for the 1967 easy listening, psychedelic instrumental LP Music of the Flower Children.

Pleis produced several of Harry Belafonte's albums, Belafonte by Request (1970), The Warm Touch (1971), and Calypso Carnival (1971). Pleis also produced several of Jack Jones' albums, A Jack Jones Christmas (1969), A Time for Us (1970), and Christmas With Jack Jones (1973). He produced Hugo Montenegro's album, Colours Of Love (1970).

In 1976, Pleis put out what would be the last album released under his own name, I Play the Songs the Whole World Sings, on Ranwood Records.

Private life and death
Pleis was married to singer Karen Chandler. He died on December 5, 1990, in Palm Springs, California, at the age of 73, and is survived by his children Michelle Pleis Stirber, Jason Pleis, and Damon Pleis.

Charted hits
 "Giant", Billboard Hot 100, #93 (10/20/1956), #91 (12/29/1956)
 "I'll Always Be In Love With You", Billboard Hot 100, #65 (12/08/1956)
 "(But As They Say) That's Life", Billboard Hot 100, #69 (6/17/1957)

Selected discography

Albums

Music from Disneyland

Broadway Goes Hollywood

Strings and Things

Serenades to Remember

50 Memorable Melodies In Hi-Fi

Music for Two Sleepy People

Medley from The Musical "Through The Years"

Stage Left, Stage Right

I Play the Songs the Whole World Sings

With Jan Savitt & the Top Hatters

With the Henri René Orchestra
RCA Victor Presents Eartha Kitt (RCA, 1953)
That Bad Eartha (EP) (RCA, 1954)
Down To Eartha (RCA, 1955)
That Bad Eartha (LP) (RCA, 1956)
Thursday's Child (RCA, 1957)

See also

Albums arranged by Jack Pleis
Albums produced by Jack Pleis

Notes

References

Further reading
Obituaries

External links
Jack Pleis Orchestra Collection at Internet Archive
Jack Pleis - Discography at 45cat.com

 Jack Pleis recordings at the Discography of American Historical Recordings.

Media

1917 births
1990 deaths
20th-century American businesspeople
20th-century American composers
20th-century American male musicians
20th-century American pianists
American jazz pianists
American male composers
American male jazz musicians
American male pianists
American pop pianists
Columbia Records artists
Decca Records artists
Jazz musicians from New York (state)
Jazz musicians from Pennsylvania
London Records artists
Musicians from New York City
Musicians from Philadelphia
Record producers from New York (state)
Record producers from Pennsylvania